Dead and Buried may refer to:

Film and TV
Dead & Buried, a 1981 film directed by Gary Sherman
Dead and Buried (Bernice Summerfield), an animated webcast based on the Doctor Who spin-off series Bernice Summerfield
"Dead and Buried" (House), an episode from season eight of House, M.D.

Music
Dead and Buried (album), a 2001 album by Jungle Rot
"Dead & Buried", a song by A Day to Remember from Common Courtesy
"Dead and Buried", a song by Plan B from Who Needs Actions When You Got Words
"Dead and Buried", a song by Alien Sex Fiend